Napoleon is a fictional character and the main antagonist of George Orwell's 1945 novel Animal Farm.  While he is at first a common farm pig, he exiles Snowball, another pig, who is his rival for power, and then takes advantage of the animals' uprising against their masters to eventually become the tyrannical "President" of Animal Farm, which he turns into a dictatorship. Napoleon's greatest crime, however, is his complete transformation into Mr. Jones (original owner of Animal Farm).

Napoleon in the allegory 

Napoleon was based on Joseph Stalin, who ruled the Soviet Union from 1924 to 1953. He is presumed to be named after the French emperor Napoleon. Napoleon and Snowball mirror the relationship between Stalin and Leon Trotsky. Trotsky supported Permanent Revolution (just as Snowball advocated overthrowing other farm owners), while Stalin supported socialism in one country (similar to Napoleon's idea of teaching the animals to use firearms, instead). When it seems Snowball will win the election for his plans, Napoleon calls in the dogs he has raised to chase Snowball from the farm. This is the first time the dogs have been seen since Napoleon took them in and raised them to act as his secret police.

Later on, after ostracising Snowball, Napoleon orders the construction of the windmill, which had been designed by Snowball and which Napoleon had opposed vigorously (just as Stalin opposed Trotsky's push for large scale industrialisation, then adopted it as a policy when Trotsky was in exile), so as to show the animals that he could be just as inventive as Snowball. The other animals are told it was Napoleon's ideas and that Snowball had stolen it. When the primitive windmill collapses after a storm, due to Napoleon's poor planning (a reference to Stalin's backward approach to the Five-Year Plans), Napoleon blames Snowball and starts a wave of terror (a reference to the Great Purge). During this period, he orders the execution of several of the animals after coercing their "confessions" of wrongdoing. He then commands the building of a second, stronger windmill, while severely cutting rations of the animals, except those of the pigs and dogs. 

Napoleon later makes a deal with Frederick (similar to the Molotov–Ribbentrop Pact shortly before World War II). Frederick tricks Napoleon by paying him for a load of timber with counterfeit money and then invading the farm (much as Germany broke its pact and invaded the Soviet Union). During the Battle of the Windmill, the windmill is destroyed; although the animals win, they pay a high price. Napoleon attempts to cover the losses by stating it was a grand victory for the animals.

Although Napoleon exhorts the other animals to fight and die for the good of the farm, he himself is a coward and a lazy one at that, in contrast to Snowball, who was more concerned with the welfare of his animal friends than his power. Napoleon uses corrupt historical revisionism to portray himself as a hero, claiming responsibility for the animals' victory in the Battle of the Cowshed, when in reality it was Snowball who had performed heroic acts in this battle. Snowball's acts are denigrated through bald-faced lies about him collaborating with Jones all along and openly supporting Jones during the battle. Snowball was wounded in the back by buckshot, but it is claimed Napoleon inflicted the wounds with his teeth. Napoleon spends most of his time inside, giving his orders through other pigs, like the cunning orator Squealer, who helps spread support for him and changes the commandments. Napoleon declares the farm a republic, and a president is elected; as the only candidate, Napoleon is elected unanimously.

During his time in power he also, through Squealer, secretly changes the Seven Commandments' prohibition against killing, drinking, and sleeping in beds, allowing his followers and him to break the original commandments, because the other animals (except for Benjamin, the cynical donkey) are not clever enough to notice, or they blame their own memories if they think they have noticed.

Ultimately, Napoleon becomes an oppressive dictator and begins to adopt many aspects of human behaviour. The pigs start walking on their hind legs, drinking alcohol, wearing clothes, and carrying whips near the end of the book. The commandments are changed to say, famously, "All animals are equal, but some animals are more equal than others." The maxim, "Four legs good, two legs bad." is changed to "Four legs good, two legs better."

The novel ends with Napoleon meeting with Pilkington of Foxwood Farm and other farmers, who claim the animals here work longer for less food than on other farms they have seen. Napoleon tells the other farmers that he has decided to abolish the use of "comrade" and declares that the farm shall revert to its original name of Manor Farm. Pilkington and he, just after declaring their similarities, fight after they both draw an ace of spades at a card game. The pigs have become so much like humans, both in behaviour and appearance, that the animals watching through a window from the outside cannot tell man and pig apart.

References 

Animal Farm characters
Cultural depictions of Joseph Stalin
Fictional dictators
Fictional farmers
Fictional mass murderers
Fictional pigs
Fictional politicians
Fictional presidents
Fictional revolutionaries
Male literary villains
Pigs in literature
Male characters in literature
Literary characters introduced in 1945
Fictional characters based on real people